Stephen Thomas Peplow (8 January 1949 – 29 December 2021) was an English footballer who played as a winger. He made 248 league appearances for Tranmere Rovers between 1973 and 1981.

Peplow married Mary in Birkenhead in 1995. His best-man was Scottish former professional footballer Barrie Mitchell, who provided him with a commissioned tape of the first ever Match of the Day, on which Peplow had made an appearance making his debut for Liverpool.

He died after a long illness on 29 December 2021, at the age of 72.

Career statistics

References

External links
 
 LFC History profile

1949 births
2021 deaths
English footballers
Footballers from Liverpool
Association football wingers
English Football League players
North American Soccer League (1968–1984) players
Liverpool F.C. players
Swindon Town F.C. players
Nottingham Forest F.C. players
Mansfield Town F.C. players
Tranmere Rovers F.C. players
Chicago Sting (NASL) players
English expatriate footballers
English expatriate sportspeople in the United States
Expatriate soccer players in the United States